The 44th Fighter Squadron is a unit of the United States Air Force, part of the 18th Wing at Kadena Air Base in Okinawa, Japan. The 44th Pursuit Squadron was activated on 1 January 1941 and assigned to the 18th Pursuit Group. The 44th Fighter Squadron is equipped with the F-15C/D Eagle.

Mission
The 44 FS operates the F-15C Eagle aircraft conducting air superiority missions.

History

World War II
The 44th Flew patrols over the Pacific from Hawaii from 7 December 1941 – October 1942.  It went on to fly combat missions in the South and Southwest Pacific from 21 December 1942 – 15 August 1945.

Vietnam War
It again flew combat missions in Southeast Asia from 18 December 1964 – 25 February 1965, 21 April – 22 June 1965, 19 – 29 October 1965, and 25 April 1967 – 6 October 1970.

The squadron was unmanned from 31 December 1966 – 24 April 1967 and November 1970–15 May 1971.

Japan
It has flown air defense over Okinawa and Japan since 1971.

On 17 January 2006 an F-15C of the squadron crashed into the Pacific Ocean near Okinawa. The pilot ejected and was rescued by an HH-60 of the 33d Rescue Squadron.

The 44th Fighter Squadron was named as the winner of the Raytheon Trophy for 2012.

Taiwan
From 3-30 September 1955, 44th Fighter-Bomber Squadron Deployed to Taoyuan Air Base, Taiwan with F-86 Sabre, returning again in 1962-1963 in support of “BLUE SKY” military exercise in Kung Kuan Air Base, Taiwan, equipped F-100 Super Sabre.

The 44th Tactical Fighter Squadron was deployed to Ching Chuan Kang Air Base in Taichung from 6 November 1972 to 10 April 1975, using F-4 Phantom II to assist Taiwan’s air defense.

2013 Sequestration
Air Combat Command officials announced a stand down and reallocation of flying hours for the rest of the fiscal year 2013 due to mandatory budget cuts.   The across-the board spending cuts, called sequestration, took effect 1 March when Congress failed to agree on a deficit-reduction plan.

Squadrons either stood down on a rotating basis or kept combat ready or at a reduced readiness level called "basic mission capable" for part or all of the remaining months in fiscal 2013. This affected the 44th Fighter Squadron with a reduction of its flying hours, placing it into a basic mission capable status from 5 April-30 September 2013.

Recent events
On 28 May 2013 an F-15C of the squadron crashed into the ocean off Okinawa. The pilot ejected and was rescued by the Air Rescue Wing Naha Detachment of the Japan Air Self-Defense Force.

On 11 June 2018 the pilot of another F-15C from the squadron ejected over the sea off Okinawa. This pilot was also rescued by the Air Rescue Wing Naha Detachment of the Japan Air Self-Defense Force.

Lineage
 Constituted as the 44th Pursuit Squadron (Interceptor) on 22 November 1940
 Activated on 1 January 1941
 Redesignated 44th Fighter Squadron on 15 May 1942
 Redesignated 44th Fighter Squadron, Two Engine on 26 January 1944
 Redesignated 44th Fighter Squadron, Single Engine on 6 May 1946
 Redesignated 44th Fighter Squadron, Jet on 23 December 1949
 Redesignated 44th Fighter-Bomber Squadron on 20 January 1950
 Redesignated 44th Tactical Fighter Squadron on 1 July 1958
 Redesignated 44th Fighter Squadron on 1 October 1991

Assignments
 18th Pursuit Group (later 18 Fighter Group), 1 January 1941
 318th Fighter Group, 20 October 1942
 South Pacific Area, 1 December 1942
 Thirteenth Air Force, 4 January 1943
 18 Fighter Group (later 18 Fighter-Bomber Group), 30 March 1943
 Attached to 18th Fighter-Bomber Wing 25 July – 30 November 1950, 6200th Air Base Wing until 30 January 1953, Thirteenth Air Force until 10 November 1954
 Attached to Thirteenth Air Force 11 December 1954 – 4 January 1955, 6200th Air Base Wing until January 1955, Air Task Group Fifth, Provisional until 16 February 1955, 6200th Air Base Wing until 14 July 1955
 Attached to Air Task Force 13, Provisional 3–30 September 1955
 Attached to 314th Air Division 15–18 April 1956
 Attached to 18th Fighter-Bomber Wing after 1 February 1957
 18th Fighter-Bomber Wing (later 18 Tactical Fighter Wing), 1 October 1957
 Attached to 2d Air Division 18 December 1964 – 25 February 1965, 21 April–23 June 1965, and 19–29 October 1965
 388th Tactical Fighter Wing, 25 April 1967 (attached to 355th Tactical Fighter Wing after 10 October 1969)
 355th Tactical Fighter Wing, 15 October 1969
 Thirteenth Air Force, 10 December 1970
 18th Tactical Fighter Wing, 15 March 1971
 Attached to 3d Tactical Fighter Wing, 2 April – 2 June 1972 and 28 July – 8 September 1972
 Attached to 327th Air Division, 6 November 1972 – 5 August 1973, 26 August – 16 September 1973, 7–28 October 1973, 18 November – 9 December 1973, 30 December 1973 – 20 January 1974, 10 February – 2 March 1974, 23 March – 13 April 1974, 4–25 May 1974, 15 June – 6 July 1974, 27 July – 16 August 1974, 5 September – 17 October 1974, 30 November 1974 – 9 January 1975, and 20 February – 10 April 1975
 18th Tactical Fighter Group, 1 May 1978
 18th Tactical Fighter Wing, 11 February 1981
 18th Operations Group, 1 October 1991–present

Stations

 Wheeler Field, Hawaii, 1 January 1941
 Bellows Field, Hawaii, 7 November 1941
 Wheeler Field, Hawaii, 12 December 1941
 Kaneohe Field, Hawaii, 27 December 1941
 Wheeler Field], Hawaii, 25 January 1942
 Bellows Field, Hawaii, 23 June – 23 October 1942
 Efate Airfield, New Hebrides 7 November 1942
 Air echelon operated from Henderson Field, Guadalcanal, Solomon Islands, 20 December 1942 – 20 March 1944
 Luganville Airfield, Espiritu Santo, New Hebrides, 25 October 1943
 Air echelon operated from Mono Airfield, Stirling Island, Solomon Islands, 20 March – 25 April 1944
 Air echelon operated from Henderson Field, Guadalcanal, Solomon Islands, 11 May – 16 July 1944
 Henderson Field, Guadalcanal, Solomon Islands, 17 July 1944
 Cape Opmarai Airfield, Netherlands East Indies, 23 August 1944
 Air echelon operated from Wama Airfield, Morotai, Netherlands East Indies, 7 November 1944 – 16 January 1945
 Lingayen Airfield, Luzon, Philippines, 13 January 1945
 McGuire Field, San Jose, Mindoro, Philippines, 26 February 1945
 Air echelon operated from Puerto Princesa Airfield, Palawan, Philippines, 26 April – 13 May 1945
 San Roque Airfield (Moret Field), Mindanao, Philippines, 4 May–November 1945
 Puerto Princesa Airfield, Palawan, Philippines, 10 November 1945

 Floridablanca Airfield, Luzon, Philippines, 17 July 1946
 Clark Field (later Clark Air Force Base), Luzon, Philippines, 3 October 1947
 Deployed to Yontan Auxiliary Air Base, Okinawa 11 November – 11 December 1954, Taoyuan Air Base Formosa, 27 January – 17 February 1955)
 Kadena Air Base, Okinawa, 15 July 1955
 Deployed to Taoyuan Air Base, Formosa, 3–30 September 1955
 Deployed to Pyongtaek Air Base, South Korea, 15–18 April 1956
 Deployed to Korat Royal Thai Air Force Base, Thailand, 18 December 1964 – 25 February 1965, 21 April – 22 June 1965, 10–29 October 1965 28 January 1966–8 April 1966
 Korat Royal Thai Air Force Base, Thailand, 25 April 1967
 Deployed to Takhli Royal Thai Air Force Base, Thailand, 1–27 February 1969
 Takhli Royal Thai Air Force Base, Thailand, 10 October 1969 – 15 March 1971
 Kadena Air Base, Okinawa (later Japan), 15 March 1971–present
 Deployed to Kunsan Air Base, South Korea, 2 April – 2 June 1972 and 28 July – 8 September 1972
 Deployed to: Ching Chuan Kang Air Base, Taiwan, 6 November 1972 – 5 August 1973, 26 August – 16 September 1973, 7–28 October 1973, 18 November – 9 December 1973, 30 December 1973 – 20 January 1974, 10 February – 2 March 1974, 23 March – 13 April 1974, 4–25 May 1974, 15 June – 6 July 1974, 27 July – 16 August 1974, 5 September – 17 October 1974, 30 November 1974 – 9 January 1975, and 20 February – 10 April 1975
 Deployed to Prince Sultan Air Base, Kingdom of Saudi Arabia, May 1998
 Deployed to Prince Sultan Air Base, Kingdom of Saudi Arabia, March 2000
 Deployed to Incirlik AB, Turkey, June 2001
 Deployed to Prince Sultan Air Base, Kingdom of Saudi Arabia, September 2002, Operation Southern Watch 
 Deployed to: SW Asia , October 2011 – April 2012
 Deployed to: Elmendorf Air Force Base, Anchorage, July 2012 – January 2013
 Deployed to: Prince Sultan Air Base, Kingdom of Saudi Arabia, April 2020 - October 2020

Aircraft

Curtiss P-40 Warhawk (1940–1942, 1943)
Lockheed P-38 Lightning (1943–1946)
North American P-51 Mustang (1946–1947, 1948–1950)
Republic P-47 Thunderbolt (1946–1948)
Lockheed F-80 Shooting Star (1946–1947, 1949–1954)

North American F-86 Sabre (1954–1957)
North American F-100 Super Sabre (1957–1964)
Republic F-105 Thunderchief (1963–1970)
McDonnell F-4 Phantom II (1971–1980)
McDonnell Douglas F-15 Eagle (1979–present)

References

 Notes

Bibliography

External links
 

044
044